The 1985 All-Ireland Under-21 Football Championship was the 22nd staging of the All-Ireland Under-21 Football Championship since its establishment by the Gaelic Athletic Association in 1964.

Cork entered the championship as defending champions.

On 25 August 1985, Cork won the championship following a 0-14 to 1-8 defeat of Derry in the All-Ireland final. This was their sixth All-Ireland title overall and their second in successive seasons.

Results

All-Ireland Under-21 Football Championship

Semi-finals

Finals

Statistics

Miscellaneous

 Meath win the Leinster title for the first time in their history.
 The All-Ireland final between Cork and Derry is the very first championship meeting between the two teams.

References

1985
All-Ireland Under-21 Football Championship